Talladega Municipal Airport  is a city-owned public-use airport located eight nautical miles (9.2 mi, 14.8 km) northeast of the central business district of Talladega, a city in Talladega County, Alabama, adjacent to Talladega Superspeedway in the city of Lincoln. It is included in the FAA's National Plan of Integrated Airport Systems for 2011–2015, which categorized it as a general aviation facility.

Facilities and aircraft 
It has one runway designated 4/22 with an asphalt surface measuring 6,032 by 100 feet (1,839 x 30 m).

For the 12-month period ending February 13, 2017, the airport had 40,880 aircraft operations, an average of 112 per day: 89% general aviation (plus 3% local), 7% military, and 2% air taxi. At that time there were 51 aircraft based at this airport: 42 single- & 5 multi-engine, 1 jet, 2 helicopter and 1  ultralight.

References

External links 
 

Airports in Alabama
Transportation buildings and structures in Talladega County, Alabama